Ganpat University (GUNI) is a private university in Kherva, Mehsana in the state of Gujarat, India. It was established in 2005 through the State Legislative act no 19 of 2005, Government of Gujarat, and recognized by the UGC under the section 2(f) of the UGC Act, 1956 having campus spread over more than 300 acres of land and more than 10,000 students on campus.

Campus 
Ganpat University and the township of Ganpat Vidyanagar, a high-tech education campus is a joint initiative, purely philanthropic in nature, by a large number of industrialists and technocrats, noble farmers, and affluent businessmen for the mission of “Social Upliftment through Education”. The University is established by the State Government by the enactment of Act No.19/2005 on 12 April 2005. In consideration of its contribution to the Education in a short period of time, the University has been given Permanent Membership of Association of Indian Universities (AIU), New Delhi besides having membership from the Association of Commonwealth Universities (ACU), UK, and International Association of Universities (IAU), France.

Ganpat University offers various unique, quality, industry-linked, and sector-focused Diploma, Undergraduate, Postgraduate, and Research level programs (Professional and Non-professional) in the field of Engineering, Management, Computer Applications, Pharmacy, Sciences, Commerce & Social Science, Architecture, Design & Planning, Maritime Studies, Law, etc.

Courses offered 
The University offers Diplomas, Under Graduate, Post – Graduate and Research Programs under the Faculties of Engineering and Technology, Pharmacy, Management, Computer Applications, Sciences, Education, Humanities and Social Science and Human Potential Development.

Courses offered includes:

 B. Tech. in Marine Engineering approved by Directorate General of Shipping (Ministry of Shipping), Govt. of India;
 B.Tech program in Cloud Computing and Big Data in collaboration with IBM; Only and First University in Western India
 M.Tech in Embedded Systems and VLSI Technology in collaboration with eInfochips; Only University in Gujarat
 Postgraduate Diploma in Milk Production Management with Dudhsagar Dairy;
 MBA (Banking & Finance) in association with the Mehsana Urban Cooperative Bank Ltd.;
 Programs in Financial Management and in Capital Market in association with the National Stock Exchange of India Ltd.;
 MMS in Enterprise Resource Planning Systems, Business Analytics, and in Project Management in academic collaboration with Victoria University, Australia;
 Most specialized (sector/industry/technology) programs in Management, Computer Science, Engineering, Pharmacy, and Sciences;

Centers of Excellence set up in university

 India's First JIM (Japan-India Institute for Manufacturing) actively supported by the Maruti Suzuki India Limited and the Govt. of Japan.
 Bosch-Rexroth Centre of Excellence for automation technologies.
 IBM Software Lab for Emerging Technologies.
 Google Learning Centre of Excellence
 GUNI Center of excellence for Additive Manufacturing (3D Printing) in Association with Stratasys Ltd.
 Other such CoEs in association with National Stock Exchange, EC Council, Micro Focus University, Shalby Hospitals, NASSCOM, Logistics Skill Council, etc.

Elets – Promoter of Digital Learning Magazine in Association with UNESCO and  Ministry of Minority Education, Government of India had conferred "World Education Summit Award – 2014" for Industry-Academia Category to the Ganpat University; out of more than 300 nominations.

References

External links
Official website
 U.V.Patel College of Engineering (UVPCE)
S.K.Patel College of Pharmaceutical Education and Research (SKPCPER)
A.M.Patel Institute Of Computer Studies(AMPICS)
V. M. Patel Institute of Management (VMPIM)
 V. M. Patel College Of Management Studies (VMPCMS)
Mehsana Urban Institute of Sciences (MUIS)
Department of Computer Science (DCS)
Center for Management Studies & Research (CMSR)
Institute of Computer Technologies (ICT)
Institute of Technology (IOT)
Ganpat University - IL & FS Institutes of Skills (ILFSIO)
Gujarat Apollo Institute of Skills Enhancement (GAISE)
Institute of Architecture (IOA)
Institute of Design(IOD)
B.S. Patel Polytechnic (BSPP)

Universities in Gujarat
2005 establishments in Gujarat
Educational institutions established in 2005
Mehsana district